Rhododendron traillianum (川滇杜鹃) is a rhododendron species native to southwest Sichuan, southeast Xizang, and northwest Yunnan, China, where it grows at altitudes of . The flowers are white or pink, with crimson spots and purple-red basal flecks.

Synonyms
 Rhododendron aberrans Tagg & Forrest

References
 "Rhododendron traillianum", Forrest & W. W. Smith, Notes Roy. Bot. Gard. Edinburgh. 8: 204. 1914.

traillianum